Two Opposites Reaching Up Toward the Peak of Progress is a public art work by American artist Thomas Queoff, located on the south side of Milwaukee, Wisconsin.  The granite sculpture is an obelisk made of a narrow piece of red granite cut into a tapering hourglass form. At its base, the sculpture is approximately two feet wide. As the sculpture narrows by a foot toward its midsection, the granite's surface is faceted along a diagonal line. Toward the sculpture's again wider top, a trapezoidal void in the shape of an elongated diamond divides the granite and gives it the appearance of the eye of a needle. The artwork is located in the traffic median on S. Layton Blvd. between W. Greenfield Ave. and W. Orchard St.

See also
Referee

References

Outdoor sculptures in Milwaukee
1977 sculptures